Darris Paul McCord (January 4, 1933 – October 9, 2013) was an American football player. He played college football for the University of Tennessee where he was selected by the Football Writers Association of America as a first-team All-American tackle in 1954. He played professional football in the National Football League (NFL), principally as a defensive end for the Detroit Lions for 13 years from 1955 to 1967. He was a member of the 1957 Detroit Lions team that won the NFL championship and was selected to play in the Pro Bowl that year.  At the time of his retirement, his 168 games with the Lions was a franchise record.

Early years
McCord was born in 1933 in Franklin, Tennessee, and moved to Detroit as a boy when his father sought a factory job. He had four siblings, two sisters, Ura and Betty, and two brothers, Ken and Frank. He began his high school education at Cass Tech in Detroit, but graduated in 1950 from Franklin High School in Tennessee. He also attended the Battle Ground Military Academy for one year after graduating from high school.

College football
In 1952, McCord enrolled at the University of Tennessee where he played college football for the Tennessee Volunteers football team under head coaches Robert Neyland in 1952 and Harvey Robinson from 1953 to 1954.  He was a member of the 1952 Tennessee team that was ranked #8 in the final AP Poll and played in the 1953 Cotton Bowl Classic. As a senior, he was selected by the Football Writers Association of America as a first-team tackle on the 1954 College Football All-America Team. He also played in the 1954 Blue–Gray Football Classic, the 1955 Senior Bowl, and the 1955 Chicago College All-Star Game.

Professional football
McCord was selected by the Detroit Lions in the third round, 36th overall pick, of the 1955 NFL Draft. He played for the Lions for 13 years from 1955 to 1967. He alternated between defensive tackle and defensive end through 1958. In 1959, he moved to left defensive end and remained there for the rest of his career with the Lions. In 1957, he played in all 12 regular season games, and both post-season games, for the Lions team that won the NFL West Division and defeated the Cleveland Browns, 59–14, in the 1957 NFL Championship Game.  After the 1957 season, McCord was invited to play in the 1958 Pro Bowl.

McCord was one of the most durable Lions of all-time, missing only two regular-season game during his career. As a member of one of the NFL’s defensive lines termed as the Fearsome Foursome, he teamed up with fellow end Sam Williams, and tackles Alex Karras and Roger Brown, forming one of the most dominant defensive lines of the early 1960s. The Foursome spearheaded a defense that holds two of the top four sack totals in Lions history, with 50 in 1964 and 49 in 1965.

At the time of his retirement, his 168 games with the Lions was a franchise record. Wayne Walker broke McCord's record in 1970, and Jason Hanson is the current record holder.

Later years
After retiring from football, McCord operated an engineering reprographics business. He was diagnosed in March 2013 with pancreatic cancer. He died at his home in Bloomfield Hills, Michigan in October 2013 at age 80. He was survived by his wife, Helen, two daughters, and a son.

References

External links
 

1933 births
2013 deaths
American football defensive ends
American football defensive tackles
Detroit Lions players
Tennessee Volunteers football players
Western Conference Pro Bowl players
Cass Technical High School alumni
Players of American football from Detroit
People from Franklin, Tennessee
Players of American football from Tennessee
Deaths from pancreatic cancer